Walnut Township is one of the fifteen townships of Gallia County, Ohio, United States. As of the 2010 census the population was 960.

Geography
Located in the southwestern part of the county, it borders the following townships:
Perry Township - north
Green Township - northeast corner
Harrison Township - east
Guyan Township - southeast corner
Mason Township, Lawrence County - south
Aid Township, Lawrence County - southwest corner
Symmes Township, Lawrence County - west
Greenfield Township - northwest

No municipalities are located in Walnut Township.

Name and history
Statewide, other Walnut Townships are located in Fairfield and Pickaway counties, plus a Walnut Creek Township in Holmes County.

Walnut Township was organized in 1819. It was named for the walnut trees prevalent in the area.

Government
The township is governed by a three-member board of trustees, who are elected in November of odd-numbered years to a four-year term beginning on the following January 1. Two are elected in the year after the presidential election and one is elected in the year before it. There is also an elected township fiscal officer, who serves a four-year term beginning on April 1 of the year after the election, which is held in November of the year before the presidential election. Vacancies in the fiscal officership or on the board of trustees are filled by the remaining trustees.

References

External links
County website 

Townships in Gallia County, Ohio
Townships in Ohio